Bà Rịa–Vũng Tàu ) is a province of Vietnam. It is located on the coast of the country's Southeast region. It also includes the Côn Đảo islands, located some distance off Vietnam's southeastern coast. From 1954 to 1975, under South Vietnam, the province was called Phước Tuy.

History
With the exception of the Côn Đảo islands, all of Bà Rịa–Vũng Tàu province was once a part of Đồng Nai province to the north. In 1979, Vũng Tàu was separated from Đồng Nai and merged with the Côn Đảo islands (formerly part of Hậu Giang province), forming the new Vũng Tàu-Côn Đảo "special zone". Later, in 1992, Bà Rịa broke away from Đồng Nai Province, merging with Vũng Tàu-Côn Đảo to form the modern province of Bà Rịa–Vũng Tàu.

Climate

The province has a tropical monsoon climate with 2 distinct seasons: a rainy season from May to October, and a dry season from November to April.

Administrative divisions
Bà Rịa–Vũng Tàu is subdivided into eight district-level sub-divisions:

 5 districts:

 Châu Đức
 Côn Đảo (island district)
 Đất Đỏ
 Long Điền
 Xuyên Mộc

 1 district-level town
 Phú Mỹ
 2 provincial cities:

 Bà Rịa (capital)
 Vũng Tàu (largest city)

They are further subdivided into six commune-level towns (or townlets), 47 communes, and 29 wards.

Demographics 
According to 2015 statistics from the General Statistics Office of Vietnam, the province has a population of 1,072,600. Urbanization in the province is above the country's average (50.52%).

Economy
Bà Rịa–Vũng Tàu provincial economic activities include: petroleum (the most important), electricity at the Phú Mỹ Power Plants and Bà Rịa Power Plant (accounting for approx. 40% of the country's total power capacity), petrochemicals: Phú Mỹ Urea Plant (800,000 metric tonnes per year), polyethylene (100,000 metric tonnes per year), steel production, and cement production. Tourism, commerce and fishing are also important economic activities of the province. Bà Rịa–Vũng Tàu contributes greatly to the country's budget. In 2005, it accounted for around 24 percent of Vietnam's budget (42,000 billion dong) of a total of 180,000 billion dong (exchange rate is 16,000 dong/dollar), ranking second, after Ho Chi Minh City before Hanoi (28,000 billion dong in 2005). The provincial GDP per capita ranks second to none in the country, over $4,000, if excluding petroleum GDP, it is over $2,000 (Hồ Chí Minh City ranks second with this index $1,850). In terms of living standards, Bà Rịa–Vũng Tàu ranks third, behind Hồ Chí Minh City and Hanoi.

Bà Rịa–Vũng Tàu is also one of the leading direct foreign investment (FDI) attractions of Vietnam, in the top five of FDI acquisition provinces of Vietnam. In tourism, there are some big projects licensed or to be licensed soon: Saigon Atlantis resort (capitalized USD 300 million), Vũng Tàu Aquarium and Bàu Trũng entertainment park ($500), and Xuyên Mộc safari ($200).

Tourism
Vũng Tàu is an important tourist destination, being particularly well known for its beaches, for its colonial-era architecture, and the Christ of Vũng Tàu, a large statue built by Vietnam's Catholic minority. It was completed in 1974, with the height of 32 metres and two outstretched arms spanning 18.4 metres. It is among the tallest statues of Christ in Asia. Among the most famous tourist destinations are the existing very popular and crowded beaches of Vũng Tàu and Long Hải and the new up and coming destinations of Hồ Tràm and Hồ Cốc located further along the South Sea coast. The main media agency in the province is the Bà Rịa–Vũng Tàu Daily Newspaper.

Determining tourism as one of the pillars of local socio-economic development, in early 2017, Bà Rịa–Vũng Tàu province decided to re-establish the Tourism Department. By the end of the year, Bà Rịa–Vũng Tàu Provincial Party Committee had issued a resolution on developing high-quality tourism, which aimed to develop the tourism infrastructure and improve the quality of tourism products and services in the direction of modernity and difference, while ensuring a safe, civilized and friendly tourist environment. According to Trịnh Hàng, Director of the Tourism Department of Bà Rịa–Vũng Tàu province, since its establishment, the Tourism Department has advised the Provincial People's Committee on many plans such as the census of tourist accommodation establishments throughout the province, the plan on enhancing the management of tourist destinations, the plan on regulations to select tourism establishments with the title "Meeting the standards for tourist service", the plan on regulations to manage the beaches, and completing the master plan on tourist development of Bà Rịa–Vũng Tàu province by 2025, with a vision to 2030. With the efforts of the provincial tourism industry and local authorities, the image of Bà Rịa–Vũng Tàu tourism has created a positive impression for visitors. Many other visitors to Vũng Tàu at this time have also been impressed by the changes in the destination. Vũng Tàu tourism is very much regaining its prestige and class.

Infrastructure
BRVT serves as a major trade gateway for Vietnam due to its proximity to industrial zones, port complex, major highways, and transshipment routes. Infrastructure investments in the province have not only increased connectivity within the province but also with neighboring economic hubs such as Ho Chi Minh City and Đồng Nai province.

Ports
BRVT is a major gateway for international shipments in Southeast Asia, due to the Cai Mep–Thị Vải port complex. The port system ranks among the major ports in the region and one of only 19 in the world capable of handling 190,000 deadweight tonnage (DWT) vessels.

Container ships from this port complex are capable of transporting goods to Europe as well as North America. In addition, the province is also around 70 km from Ho Chi Minh City's Cát Lái port.

The government is also planning to increase investments in the development of terminals and road infrastructure to increase connectivity, efficiency, and port capacity.

Airports

The Tân Sơn Nhất International Airport in Ho Chi Minh City is less than 90 km from the province and around 70 km from the Cai Mep–Thị Vải port complex.

In addition, the new Long Thành International Airport which is under construction is only around 30 minutes from the port complex and 50 km from the province.

Highways

The province has access to major national highways such as National Highway 51 and National Highway 1. In addition, expressways such as Ho Chi Minh City – Long Thành – Dầu Giây Expressway, Biên Hòa - Vũng Tàu expressway, and Bến Lức - Long Thành highway (to open in 2020) further increase connectivity with the surrounding provinces.

Within the province, the connectivity between ports or industrial zones with the national roadway systems is supported by numerous regional highways, port roads, and industrial zone roads.

Industrial zones

As of August 2018, there are 15 industrial parks in BRVT, including nine which are operational with an average occupancy rate of 47 percent. There are currently 339 projects in local industrial parks, including 162 foreign and 177 domestic projects.

The locality is also home to two industrial parks that specialize in supporting industries, Phú Mỹ 3 and Đá Bạc.

International relations

Sister cities

There are 9 sister cities/regions of Bà Rịa–Vũng Tàu province:

Festival
Nghinh Co Festival at Dinh Cố Shrine (12th day of the second lunar month)
Sea Festival
The fair in this festival will also showcase products and promote cooperation between businesses in industry, agriculture, trade and services in the province and neighboring provinces. Several seminars and workshops on trade and tourism promotion, as well as environmental protection, will be organised
International Kite Festival (held annually since 2009 in Vũng Tàu City)

Gallery

References

External links
  
 
 

 
Southeast (Vietnam)
Provinces of Vietnam